Patricia Klindienst is an American writer, and independent scholar.
She graduated from Stanford University, with a Ph.D. 
She taught at Yale University.

Awards
 2007 American Book Award
 2008 Phillip and Eric Heiner Endowed Fellowship, Virginia Center for Creative Arts

Works
 
 "Ritual Work on Human Flesh: Livy's Lucretia and the Rape of the Body Politic," Helios 17, Spring 1990
 
"Three Moments Upon Waking", Mississippi Review, June 2003
"A Punjabi Garden, Part I,II,III", Society of Mutual Autopsy Review

Books

Anthologies

References

External links
"2010 Convocation Speech" by Patricia Klindienst, Hampshire College 
"Patricia Klindienst, THE EARTH KNOWS MY NAME", Writer's Voice
"Patricia Klindienst – The Earth Knows My Name", New Hampshire Public Radio, Monadnock Summe, July 25, 2009

American women writers
Hampshire College alumni
Stanford University alumni
Yale University faculty
Living people
Year of birth missing (living people)
American Book Award winners
American women academics
21st-century American women